Torcy may refer to several places in France:

Communes
 Torcy, Pas-de-Calais
 Torcy, Saône-et-Loire
 Torcy, Seine-et-Marne
 Torcy-en-Valois, Aisne
 Torcy-et-Pouligny, Côte-d'Or
 Torcy-le-Grand, Aube
 Torcy-le-Grand, Seine-Maritime
 Torcy-le-Petit, Aube
 Torcy-le-Petit, Seine-Maritime

Other
 Arrondissement of Torcy, Seine-et-Marne department

oc:Torcy